The Castle of Canossa is a castle in Canossa, province of Reggio Emilia, northern Italy.

It is especially known as the seat of the Walk to Canossa, the meeting of Emperor Henry IV and Pope Gregory VII during the Investiture Controversy (1077).

History 
The castle was built around 940 by Adalbert Atto Conte of Beggia and Mantura, son of Sigifredo of Lucca, a Lombard nobleman, on the summit of a rocky hill. Apart from Adalberto's residence, it included a convent with 12 Benedictine monks and the church of Sant'Apollonio. It was protected by a triple line of walls; between the two lower lines were the barracks and the residence of the servants.

During the Middle Ages, it was one of the most impregnable castles in Italy. Here in 950 Adelaide of Italy, the widow of King Lothair II, took refuge; Berengar II of Ivrea besieged her for three years, but in vain.

The next most relevant episode is the famous reconciliation between Henry IV and Gregory VII, who was a friend of Matilda of Tuscany, who had inherited the castle, the centre of an impressive chain of watch towers and castles. Matilda established that her lands would be assigned to the Church after her death (1115), but her heirs did not accept it.

In 1255 the men of Reggio destroyed the castle and the church. Later it was returned to the Canossa family. After the death of Giberto da Correggio in 1321, it was again a possession of Reggio until 1402, when Simone, Guido and Alberto Canossa gained it back; in 1409, however, they ceded it to the House of Este, who (apart a short period under Ottavio Farnese, Duke of Parma in 1557) held it until 1796.

In 1502 Ercole I d'Este named the poet Ludovico Ariosto castellan. He resided here for six months. In 1593 Canossa was assigned as fief to the Counts Rondinelli. In 1642 Duke Francesco I entrusted it to the Valentini. The latter were ousted in 1796 by the rebellious local population, who joined the Republic of Reggio.

After being returned to the Valentini, in 1878 the Castle was acquired by the Italian State, and was declared a national monument.

External links

matildedicanossa.it

Buildings and structures in the Province of Reggio Emilia
Castles in Emilia-Romagna
Este residences
Matilda of Tuscany

http://fmg.ac/Projects/MedLands/NORTHERN%20ITALY%20900-1100.htm#PrangardaMofTurin